Events from the year 1696 in Sweden

Incumbents
 Monarch – Charles XI

Events

 The Velthen Company perform in Stockholm. 
 A repeated failed harvest results in the culmination and continuation of the Great Famine.

Births

 - Henrietta Polyxena of Vasaborg, princess  (died 1777)

Deaths

 March - Jean de la Vallée, architect  (born 1620) 
 June - Greta Duréel, accomplice in the Great Jewel Fraud of the Swedish National Bank (born year unknown)

References

 
Years of the 17th century in Sweden
Sweden